The Lossiemouth Sandstone is a Middle to Late Triassic (Ladinian to Norian) age geological formation. It is exposed on the south side of the Moray Firth near Lossiemouth and near Golspie in Sutherland. Dinosaur remains are among the fossils that have been recovered from the formation.

Fossil content

See also 
 List of dinosaur-bearing rock formations
 List of stratigraphic units with indeterminate dinosaur fossils
 List of fossiliferous stratigraphic units in Scotland
 Ischigualasto Formation, contemporaneous fossiliferous formation of the Ischigualasto-Villa Unión Basin, Argentina
 Candelária Formation, contemporaneous fossiliferous formation of the Paraná Basin in southeastern Brazil
 Molteno Formation, contemporaneous fossiliferous formation of the Karoo Basin in southern Africa
 Fremouw Formation, contemporaneous fossiliferous formation of Antarctica

References

Bibliography

Further reading 
 M. J. Benton and P. S. Spencer. 1995. Fossil Reptiles of Great Britain. Chapman & Hall, London 1-386
 R. L. Paton. 1975. A Catalogue of Fossil Vertebrates in the Royal Scottish Museum, Edinburgh. Part Four / Amphibia & Reptilia. Royal Scottish Museum Information Series. Geology 5 1-38
 G. Tresise and W. A. S. Sarjeant. 1997. The Tracks of Triassic Vertebrates: Fossil Evidence from North-West England. 1-204

Geologic formations of Scotland
Triassic System of Europe
Triassic Scotland
Carnian Stage
Norian Stage
Sandstone formations
Paleontology in Scotland
Geography of Moray